The men's pole vault event at the 1963 Pan American Games was held at the Pacaembu Stadium in São Paulo on 28 April.

Results

References

Athletics at the 1963 Pan American Games
1963